= 1977 Egyptian protection of national unity referendum =

A referendum on "the protection of national unity" was held in Egypt on 10 February 1977. It was approved by 99.4% of voters, with a turnout of 96.7%.

== Results ==
Choice	Votes	%
For	9,166,179	99.4
Against	54,138	0.6
Invalid/blank votes	27,420	-
Total	9,247,737	100
Registered voters/turnout	9,564,482	96.7
Source: Nohlen et al.
